The following events occurred in May 1962:

May 1, 1962 (Tuesday)
Norwich City F.C. won the English Football League Cup, beating Rochdale F.C. 1 to 0 in the second leg of the two-game final after having defeated them 3 to 0 at Rochdale on April 26, for an aggregate score of 4 to 0.
A gas analysis laboratory was installed in Hanger S at Cape Canaveral to analyze gases used in the Mercury spacecraft.
McDonnell proposed to evaluate the Gemini rendezvous radar and spacecraft maneuvering system on early flights by using a rendezvous evaluation pod to be ejected from the spacecraft in orbit. Manned Spacecraft Center (MSC) liked the idea and asked McDonnell to pursue the study. During the last week in June, McDonnell received approval from MSC to go ahead with the design and development of the rendezvous pod. It would contain a radar transponder, C-band beacon, flashing light, and batteries.
Air Force Space Systems Division (SSD) awarded a letter contract to Lockheed Missiles and Space Company for eight Agena vehicles to be modified as Gemini Agena target vehicles (GATV). Mission requirements were to (1) establish a circular orbit within specified limits, (2) provide a stable target with which the spacecraft could rendezvous and dock, (3) respond to commands from either ground stations or the spacecraft, (4) perform a complex series of orbital maneuvers by means of either real-time or stored commands if less than optimum launch of Agena or spacecraft occurred, and (5) provide an active orbit life of five days. Lockheed's analysis of these mission requirements provided the design criteria for the major modifications required to adapt the Agena to the Gemini mission: (1) modification of the primary propulsion system; (2) addition of a secondary propulsion system (two  and two  thrusters) to provide ullage orientation and minor orbit adjustments; (3) design of a digital command and communications subsystem including a programmer, controller, pulse-code-modulated telemetry system, and onboard tape recorder; (4) design of changes to provide the guidance and control functions peculiar to the GATV; and (5) addition of an auxiliary forward equipment rack with an interface capable of supporting the target docking adapter. On direction from Air Force Systems Command Headquarters, SSD authorized Lockheed to proceed with the Gemini-Agena program on March 19.
Following a Lockheed briefing on pulse-code-modulation (PCM) instrumentation systems, representatives of Goddard Space Flight Center and Manned Spacecraft Center (MSC) formed a small working group to discuss the feasibility of making the Gemini telemetry system a full PCM system. PCM was a digital telemetry system which could provide more channels of information, faster data rates, improved accuracy, and less weight of equipment per data channel. Goddard had already reviewed several PCM ground station proposals and had concluded that such a system could handle future NASA programs. All who attended the meeting agreed that a full PCM telemetry system, airborne and ground, could be implemented in time to support the Gemini program. Gemini Project Office approved the formation of an MSC-Gemini PCM Instrumentation Working Group to be responsible for the implementation and compatibility of the airborne and ground PCM system for Gemini. On June 27, Walter C. Williams, MSC Associated Director, notified Goddard of NASA's decision "to utilize a PCM telemetry system for Gemini and Agena real time data." Ten sites were selected for the installation of PCM equipment; each of these also received dual acquisition equipment, dual digital command system, and pulse coders for distinguishing between the crewed Gemini spacecraft and the Agena target when both were in orbit.
The Dayton Hudson Corporation opened the first of its Target discount stores. The store (now a "SuperTarget") is located at 1515 West County Road B, in the St. Paul suburb of Roseville, Minnesota.
Died: Sir Sydney Cockerell, 94, English curator and art collector

May 2, 1962 (Wednesday)
An OAS car bomb exploded at the docks of Algiers, killing 96 people. The deaths of 14 other people and the injury of 147 overall made the occasion "the bloodiest single day in the modern history of Algeria's capital".
The value of the Canadian dollar was put at a fixed exchange rate at 92.5 United States cents (USD 0.925) after having had a fluctuating value since September 30, 1950. The Canadian Exchange Fund would purchase U.S. dollars in order to keep the Canadian dollar from going more than one percent above ¢ American, until May 30, 1970.
Benfica (of Lisbon), champion of Portugal's Primeira Divisão league, won the European Cup for the second time in a row, beating Real Madrid (champions of Spain's La Liga, 5 to 3, before a crowd of 61,257 at Amsterdam's Olympisch Stadion.
Born: 
Elizabeth Berridge, American actress; in New Rochelle, New York 
Jimmy "Whirlwind" White, English snooker player; in Tooting 
Ty Herndon, American country music singer; in Meridian, Mississippi
Died: Clairvius Narcisse, 40, Haitian peasant who would attain media attention from 1980 onward as being the identity of a zombie  after her death.

May 3, 1962 (Thursday)
A railway crash involving three separate trains killed 160 people in Japan near the Mikawashima Station at Arkawawa, a ward of Tokyo.  Engineer Norifumi Minakami drove a freight train through a red signal and sideswiped a commuter train.  As surviving passengers climbed out of that train, a third train ran through them, then plunged over an embankment.
British supermarket executive Alan Sainsbury, CEO of the Sainsbury's Supermarkets chain of grocery stores, was created a life peer in the House of Lords, with the title Baron Sainsbury.

May 4, 1962 (Friday)
Dr. Masaki Watanabe of Japan performed the very first arthroscopic surgery to repair a meniscus tear, a common injury for athletes. The first patient to receive the procedure was a 17-year-old basketball player, who was returned to playing six weeks after the meniscectomy and resection of his right knee by Dr. Watanabe.
A memorandum was issued on proposed experiments for inclusion in Project Mercury crewed orbital flights. This action was in keeping with a statement made by Walter C. Williams before a University of Houston audience that the spacecraft would be used as a test bed for more ambitious space projects.
Scott Carpenter, designated as the primary pilot for the Mercury-Atlas 7 (MA-7) crewed orbital flight, completed a simulated MA-7 mission exercise.
Manned Spacecraft Center issued its third analysis of the Gemini program schedule. Spacecraft ground test plans had been formulated, and the construction of test hardware had begun. Two boilerplate spacecraft had been added to the program to facilitate ground testing. Flight No. 2 was the first planned to use paraglider, but the paraglider program required close attention to prevent schedule slippage; plans to substitute a parachute landing system for paraglider in this flight, should it prove necessary, had been initiated. Spacecraft manufacturing schedules were endangered by late delivery of components from vendors: chief threats to spacecraft No. 1 were components of the instrument and recording system and the inertial platform; for spacecraft No. 2, communication and electrical system components. No problems were anticipated with the booster. The analysis indicated no change in the launch schedule.
U.S. Ambassador to Canada Livingston Merchant, in his final month as envoy, made a final visit to Prime Minister John Diefenbaker in Ottawa. At the meeting Diefenbaker angrily brought out an American memorandum that had been left behind during President Kennedy's visit in May 1961. The President's handwritten notes in the margin included the letters "OAS" (the Organization of American States), "but Diefenbaker read Kennedy's handwriting as 'SOB'," and threatened to use the memo (and the suggestion that Kennedy thought that Diefenbaker was a "son of a bitch") in the upcoming June 18 elections. After conferring with his superiors, the ambassador later told Diefenbaker that he was personally reluctant to report "anything which could be construed as a threat" and that publication of the memo would "make difficult future relations". The memo was never used, but Kennedy and Diefenbaker never trusted each other again.
During the El Carupanazo revolt against Venezuelan President Rómulo Betancourt, Venezuelan Air Force aircraft began a two-day attack on rebel positions at Carúpano.

May 5, 1962 (Saturday)
Seattle businessman Stanley McDonald inaugurated a cruise ship service that would eventually become Princess Cruises, starting with the departure of the Canadian steamer SS Yarmouth from San Francisco for the first of 17 ten-day cruises to the 1962 Seattle World's Fair and back.  After a successful six-month lease of the Yarmouth, McDonald would spend more than three years in making plans for the Princess Cruise line (which would be made famous by The Love Boat television series) on a regular series of winter tours from Los Angeles to Acapulco, starting at the end of 1965.  "Yarmouth Cruises, Inc."
Tottenham Hotspur F.C. retained the FA Cup with a 3–1 win over Burnley F.C. in front of 100,000 fans (including Queen Elizabeth II and Prince Philip) at Wembley Stadium, and became only the second team in Football League history to win the Cup two years in a row.  Goals were scored for the Spurs by Jimmy Greaves, Bobby Smith and captain Danny Blanchflower, with the Clarets' sole score coming from Jimmy Robson.

May 6, 1962 (Sunday)
The first nuclear explosion to be caused by an American ballistic missile, rather than by a bomb dropped from an aircraft or at a fixed site, was accomplished at Christmas Island,  from its launch site.  Previous ICBM tests had been done without a nuclear warhead.  The USS Ethan Allen fired the armed Polaris A-2 missile, from underwater, to its target.
Antonio Segni was elected President of the Italian Republic on the ninth round of balloting by the combined houses of Italian Parliament, and after four days of voting.  In the first round, Segni of the Democrazia Cristiana (DC) party was pitted against three other candidates, Giuseppe Saragat (Partito Socialista Democratico Italiano (PSDI); Umberto Terracini of the Italian Communist Party (P.C.I.); and Sandro Pertini of the Partito Socialista Italiano (PSI), with no candidate receiving at least two-thirds of the vote in on the first three ballots.  After Terracini and Pertini dropped out, and a 50 percent rather than two-thirds majority determined the choice, Segni defeated Saragat, 443 votes to 334.
Martin de Porres (1579-1639) of Peru was canonized as the first mixed-race Roman Catholic saint, 125 years after his beatification.  The son of a Spanish nobleman father and a freed slave mother of African and Indian descent, Porres was designated as the patron saint of mixed-race individuals, barbers, innkeepers, and public health workers.
The National Bowling League rolled its last game, with the Detroit Thunderbirds defeating the Twin Cities Skippers, 27-15, to sweep the best 3-of-five "World Series of Bowling" for the first, and only, NBL championship.
Died: Thomas Gilcrease, 72, American philanthropist and collector of indigenous artifacts of the Americas

May 7, 1962 (Monday)
The 1962 Cannes Film Festival opened.
Three officials of the Central Intelligence Agency met with U.S. Attorney General Robert F. Kennedy and implored him to stop investigation of Mafia crime boss Sam Giancana. For the first time, the CIA revealed that it had offered $150,000 to several organized criminals to carry out a "hit" against Cuba's Prime Minister, Fidel Castro. The secret meeting would become public in 1975, with the release of the Rockefeller Commission's report on an investigation of the CIA.
The six-member township council of Centralia, Pennsylvania, voted in favor of improving the new landfill at the edge of town, in time for Memorial Day ceremonies. Every year, the contents of the city dump would be set afire, despite a state law prohibiting the practice, and the May 27 burning would prove to be the end of Centralia.
NASA announced that the Mercury-Atlas 7 (MA-7) crewed orbital flight would be delayed several days due to checkout problems with the Atlas launch vehicle.
Detroit became the first city in the United States to use traffic cameras and electronic signs to regulate the flow of traffic. The pilot program began with 14 television cameras along a  stretch of the John C. Lodge Freeway, between the Davison Expressway and Interstate 94.

May 8, 1962 (Tuesday)
The Broadway musical A Funny Thing Happened on the Way to the Forum, with music and lyrics by Stephen Sondheim, had the first of 964 performances.  Set in ancient Rome, and inspired by the comedies of Titus Maccius Plautus (254 BC–184 BC), it would close on August 29, 1964, and be adapted as a film as well.
Francisco Orlich Bolmarcich was inaugurated for a four-year term as the 36th President of Costa Rica, succeeding Mario Echandi Jiménez.
J. Paul Austin became the new President of The Coca-Cola Company.  During his 19-year tenure, Coca-Cola's annual worldwide sales would grow ten-fold, from $567 million to $5.9 billion.
Brian Epstein visited the HMV (EMI) store at 363 Oxford Street, London, to have The Beatles' Decca audition tape transferred to 78 rpm acetates.
Died: Alfred Madsen, 74, Norwegian engineer, newspaper editor, trade unionist and politician

May 9, 1962 (Wednesday)
The Sikorsky S-64 Skycrane helicopter, capable of lifting 20,000 pounds (over 9,000 kg), made its first flight.
The Beatles signed their first recording contract, with Parlophone, after Brian Epstein persuaded George Martin to sign them, sight unseen.
At the request of the U.S. Department of State, the Immigration and Naturalization Service agreed to issue a United States visa to Marina Prusakova Oswald so that she could accompany her husband, Lee Harvey Oswald, on his return to the United States.
Federico Fellini began shooting the film 8½.
The lunar crater Albategnius became the first area of the moon to be illuminated by a laser beam from Earth.  Scientists Louis Smullin and Giorgio Fiocco of MIT aimed the beam and then observed it.
Princess Marie-Christine of Belgium was confirmed by Bishop Fulton Sheen.
Born: Dave Gahan, English singer-songwriter; in North Weald, Essex

May 10, 1962 (Thursday)
Pravda, the official newspaper for the Soviet Communist Party, printed the official response to pleas to prevent the continued tearing down of Moscow's monasteries and churches. The plea had been in an editorial in the magazine Moskva about the urban renewal decisions of the Architectural Planning Administration. The editorials were unsigned, but apparently approved by First Secretary Khrushchev. The day before, three of the journalists from Moskva were informed that the article was anti-Soviet.
John C. Fischer, Jr., an aerospace technologist at Lewis Research Center, put forward a plan for a two-phased approach for a space station program. The more immediate step, involving launching a crewed and fully equipped station into orbit, would span some four to six years. Such a station would allow investigation of orbital station-keeping, rotation of personnel in orbit through supply and ferry craft, and replacement of modules in orbit through modular construction. The second and more sophisticated phase of a space station program, evolving from the earlier step, envisioned injection of an uncrewed inflatable structure into orbit which would then be crewed and resupplied by ferry vehicles (using hardware and techniques developed under the earlier phase of such a program). This more sophisticated approach included artificial gravity (eliminating many human and hardware-design problems of long periods of zero-g); gyroscopic stability of the platform (eliminating requirements for propellants to maintain the station's orientation in orbit); and supply vehicles designed for reentry and landing at selected airports (eliminating the expense of conventional recovery methods).
On May 10 and 11, Gemini Project Office directed McDonnell to determine what would be involved in opening and closing the Gemini spacecraft hatches in the space environment and Manned Spacecraft Center's Life Systems Division to determine what special pressure suit features would be required to provide crew members with a 15-minute extravehicular capability.
On May 10 and 11, Manned Spacecraft Center's Life Systems Division proposed to measure seven parameters for determining crew condition during all Gemini flights. These were, in order of priority: blood pressure, with electrocardiogram and phonocardiogram serving as first and second backup; electroencephalogram; respiration, galvanic skin response, and body temperature. Gemini Project Office reviewed these requirements and approved the following measurements: electrocardiogram, respiration rate and depth, oral temperature, blood pressure, phonocardiogram, and nuclear radiation dose. Biomedical measurement devices had still to be designed, developed, qualified, and procured.
On May 10 and 11, a postlanding survival kit was proposed for use by Gemini crew members that would be basically similar to the one used in Project Mercury.
The Japanese monster film Mothra opened in the United States, after having premiered in Japan on July 30, 1961.
Born: John Ngugi, Kenyan athlete and 1988 Olympic gold medalist in the 5000 metre race; in Nyahururu

May 11, 1962 (Friday)
Radio Station Belarus began broadcasting.
In accepting the Sylvanus Thayer Award, retired General Douglas MacArthur delivered his memorable "Duty, Honor, Country" speech to West Point cadets. The 82-year-old MacArthur delivered the 30-minute address from memory and without notes, and a recording of the remarks would be released as a record album later.
Manned Spacecraft Center (MSC) decided to establish a liaison office at Martin-Baltimore. Scott H. Simpkinson of Gemini Project Office assumed the post on May 15, but he was soon replaced by Harle Vogel, who remained in the position throughout the program. The purpose of the office was to facilitate exchange of information between MSC and Martin.
Students at Orange County State College (later California State University, Fullerton) staged what was billed as "The First Intercollegiate Elephant Race in Human History", with 15 elephants raced through different events in Fullerton, California. Winners in various weight ranges included "Kinney" of Long Beach State College and "Captain Hook" of Orange Coast College.
Died: Hans Luther, 83, Chancellor of Germany from 1925 to 1926

May 12, 1962 (Saturday)

The Philippines continued to distance itself from its past as an American protectorate, changing its name on postage and coinage to Pilipinas.
Archie Moore gave up his world light heavyweight boxing title to move up to heavyweight. His successor was Harold Johnson.
James E. Webb, the new Administrator of NASA, reviewed the Gemini program. Project Gemini cost estimates at this point (£744.3 million) had increased substantially over the original estimate of $250 million. Estimated spacecraft cost had risen from $240.5 to $391.6 million; Titan II cost, from $113.0 to $161.8 million; Atlas-Agena, from $88.0 to $106.3 million; and supporting development (including the paraglider program), from $29.0 to $36.8 million. Estimated operations costs had declined from $59.0 to $47.8 million.
Nine men, on a fishing trip, died in shark-infested waters after their boat sank off the coast of Newport Beach, California. Chester McMain of Norwalk was taking the Happy Jack on its first voyage when it ran into rough weather. Though they were wearing life jackets, the sharks apparently pulled them underwater. Searchers on the fishing boat Mardic located six bodies the next day, with sharks swimming around the group.
Born: Emilio Estevez, American actor, to then-TV actor Martin Sheen and Janet Templeton Sheen; in Staten Island, New York
Died: Frank Jenks, 59, American film comedian

May 13, 1962 (Sunday)

Vice-President Sarvepalli Radhakrishnan was sworn in as the second President of India, succeeding Rajendra Prasad. He would serve a full four-year term.
Born: Paul McDermott, Australian comedian and television presenter, in Adelaide

May 14, 1962 (Monday)
Prince Juan Carlos of Spain, grandson of Spain's last monarch up that time, King Alfonso XIII, married Princess Sophie of Greece, daughter of King Paul, at a ceremony in Athens. The two would become King and Queen when the monarchy was restored in Spain in 1975.
On May 14 and 15, representatives of McDonnell, Northrop Ventura (formerly Radioplane), Weber Aircraft, and Manned Spacecraft Center attended the first Gemini ejection seat design review at McDonnell in St. Louis.
Died: Silpa Bhirasri, 69, Thai sculptor and founder of Silpakorn University who had been born in Italy as Corrado Feroci

May 15, 1962 (Tuesday)
Scott Carpenter, designated as the primary pilot of the Mercury-Atlas 7 (MA-7) manned orbital flight, flew a simulated mission with the spacecraft mated to the Atlas launch vehicle.
The last execution of an American for armed robbery, without homicide, took place in Huntsville, Texas as an African-American man, 20-year-old Herbert Lemuel Bradley of Dallas, was put to death in the electric chair. Bradley, who had shot an elderly grocer six times in the robbery, told reporters before he died, "I have no complaints. A man has to die sometime, but I don't think this has been fair," noting that he shared the prison with convicts serving terms of 5 to 25 years for armed robbery. The Texas Court of Criminal Appeals had upheld the death sentence on February 28, noting that the victim was still in the hospital more than a year after being shot four times in the stomach during a gunfight.
Born:
Amit Chaudhuri, Indian author; in Calcutta (now Kolkata)
Julie Otsuka, American author; in Palo Alto, California
Died: Michael Dillon, 47, English physician, who became (in 1946) the first person to undergo female-to-male transsexual phalloplasty

May 16, 1962 (Wednesday)
The first 1,800 United States Marines dispatched to Southeast Asia, troops of the 3rd Marine Expeditionary Brigade, arrived at Bangkok to guard Thailand's border with Laos. The Thai government had given permission for 5,000 American troops to stay.
On May 16 and 17, a Launch Vehicle-Spacecraft Interface Working Group was established. Gemini Project Office (GPO) and Aerospace had agreed on the need for such a group at a Gemini-Titan coordination meeting on May 11. The main function of the group, composed of Martin and McDonnell personnel with a McDonnell representative as chairman, was to provide mutual exchange of design and physical data on mechanical, electrical, and structural details between the spacecraft contractor and the booster contractor. The group would make no policy decisions; its actions were to be reviewed at regularly scheduled coordination meetings held by GPO.
At a mechanical systems coordination meeting on May 16 and 17, representatives of McDonnell and Gemini Project Office decided to develop more powerful retrograde rocket motors for the Gemini spacecraft. McDonnell's original subcontract with Thiokol was accordingly terminated and a new subcontract was let on July 20. Development of the new motors was expected to cost $1.255 million.

May 17, 1962 (Thursday)
Thalidomide was withdrawn from sale in Japan, bringing an end to the worldwide distribution of the morning sickness drug that had caused birth defects. Dainippon Pharmaceutical halted further shipments. About 1,200 "thalidomide babies" were born in Japan.
The Mercury-Atlas 7 (MA-7) crewed orbital mission was postponed a second time because of necessary modifications to the altitude-sensing instrumentation in the parachute-deployment system.
African-American civil rights leader Martin Luther King Jr. delivered a proposed "Second Emancipation Proclamation" to U.S. President Kennedy along with a proposal that Kennedy sign an executive order with the proposed title "On Behalf of the Negro Citizenry of the United States of America in commemoration of the Centennial of the Proclamation of Emancipation". Kennedy declined to act on the request "and noticeably avoided all centennial celebrations" of the original Emancipation Proclamation (which had been signed by U.S. President Abraham Lincoln on September 22, 1862).
Born: Arturo Peniche, Mexican telenovela actor, in Mexico City
Died: E. Franklin Frazier, 67, American sociologist

May 18, 1962 (Friday)
British soldiers erected a barbed wire barricade along Hong Kong's  border with the People's Republic of China. The purpose was to block refugees from fleeing China into Hong Kong. At the time, as many as 4,000 people were attempting to flee Communist China into the British colony. The next day, British administrators imposed penalties on any Hong Kong resident attempting to assist a refugee's escape.
The Panchen Lama, leader of the Tibetan people since the nation's conquest by Communist China, presented a 70,000-word petition to visiting Chinese Premier Zhou Enlai, pleading for relief for the suffering of Tibetans under Communist rule. Repression of Tibetan Buddhists eased to some extent after the Panchen Lama's bold move.
McDonnell subcontracted the parachute landing system for Gemini to Northrop Ventura at an estimated cost of $1,829,272. The parachute landing system was to be used for the first Gemini flight. Gemini Project Office had decided in April on using a single-chute system, one  diameter ring-sail parachute. At a mechanical systems coordination meeting in Houston on May 16-17, however, it was decided to add an  ring-sail drogue parachute to the system. Fifteen seconds later the main recovery parachute would switch from single-point to two-point suspension, followed in five seconds by the initiation of reaction control system propellant dump which would take no longer than 105 seconds. The recovery parachute would be jettisoned shortly after impact. At another coordination meeting on May 23-24, Manned Spacecraft Center concurred in this proposed sequencing.
Born: Karel Roden, Czech actor, in České Budějovice

May 19, 1962 (Saturday)
A third postponement was made for the Mercury-Atlas 7 (MA-7) mission due to irregularities detected in the temperature control device on a heater in the Atlas flight control system.
Marilyn Monroe made her last significant public appearance, singing "Happy Birthday, Mr. President" at a birthday party for President John F. Kennedy at Madison Square Garden. The event was part of a fundraiser to pay off the Democratic Party's four million-dollar debt remaining from Kennedy's 1960 presidential campaign. Monroe was stitched into a $12,000 dress "made of nothing but beads" and wore nothing underneath as she appeared at the request of Peter Lawford; President Kennedy thanked her afterward, joking, "I can now retire from politics after having had 'Happy Birthday' sung to me in such a sweet, wholesome way."
Died: Gabriele Münter, 85, German expressionist painter

May 20, 1962 (Sunday)
The first specifically built coronary care unit in the world opened at the Bethany Hospital in Kansas City, Missouri, under the planning of cardiologist Dr. Hughes Day.  Other CCUs followed in Toronto, Sydney, New York and Philadelphia, and by 1970, most major hospitals had units designed to treat heart attacks.
The 1962 Dutch Grand Prix at Circuit Park Zandvoort opened the Formula One Championship season.  It was won by Graham Hill.  The non-championship 1962 Naples Grand Prix took place on the same day at the Posillipo Circuit, and was won by Willy Mairesse.
The Conseil national de la Résistance, a terrorist organization with a goal of assassinating France's president Charles de Gaulle, was founded in Rome by former French Army Lieutenant Colonel Antoine Argoud, who had escaped arrest for his membership in the rebel Organisation armée secrète that sought to stop France from granting independence to Algeria.
Born:
Aleksandr Dedyushko, Belarusian television actor, at Volkovysk, Byelorussian SSR, Soviet Union (now Vawkavysk, Belarus) (d. 2007) 
Christiane F. (real name Christiane Vera Felscherinow), German heroin addict who wrote a memoir of her drug abuse; in Hamburg.

May 21, 1962 (Monday)
Soviet leader Nikita Khrushchev accepted the recommendation from his Defense Council to place nuclear missiles in Cuba, an act which would lead to the Cuban Missile Crisis and the threat of a nuclear war between the U.S. and the U.S.S.R. in October.
Egypt's President Gamel Abdel Nasser unveiled his "National Charter of the Arab Socialist Union", proclaiming that the "Arab Revolution" would win its "battle of destiny" by "enlightened thought", "free movement" and "clear perception" of the revolution's objectives.
In Baltimore, federal district judge Roszel C. Thomsen dismissed the antitrust lawsuit by the American Football League against the National Football League. The suit arose from the NFL's action of placing franchises in Dallas and Minneapolis after the AFL had been founded with teams there.
McDonnell awarded an $8 million subcontract to Electro-Mechanical Research, Inc., Sarasota, Florida, to provide the data transmission system for the Gemini spacecraft. Both the spacecraft and target vehicle used pulse-code-modulation (PCM) telemetry, a technique for encoding data in digital form by varying the length of pulses to form an information-carrying code. Once encoded, measurements were transmitted over a radio link to ground receiving stations. The data transmission system consisted of a PCM subsystem, an onboard tape recorder, and two VHF transmitters; it was capable of transmitting data in real time or delayed time.
Amendment No. 6 to the Gemini launch vehicle procurement contract assigned $2.609 million to fund the construction necessary to convert pad 19 at Cape Canaveral for Gemini flights. The Air Force had originally constructed pad 19 for the Titan I development program. Following the final Titan I development flight (January 29) from the Cape, design of the required modifications had begun in February. In April, Gemini Project Office decided that Pad 19 would have an erector rather than a gantry, the upper third of which would be designed as a white room. The final design review of pad 19 modifications took place July 9-10, and the U.S. Army Corps of Engineers awarded the construction contract to Consolidated Steel, Cocoa Beach, Florida. Construction began in September. Work was completed and pad 19 was activated on October 17, 1963.
Born:
Tina Landau, American playwright and theatre director, in New York City 
Hege Storhaug, Norwegian journalist and activist, in Arendal

May 22, 1962 (Tuesday)
The airliner was flying from Chicago to Kansas City when the explosion occurred in the rear lavatory while the jet was over Centerville, Iowa near the border between the U.S. states of Iowa and Missouri. The fuselage came down  from Centerville on a farm near Unionville, Missouri. Contact was lost at 9:15 pm and the plane had disappeared from radar at 9:40 after leaving behind a  line of debris, including a briefcase with the initials "T.G.D."; Thomas G. Doty, one of the passengers, had been on his way to Kansas City to face criminal charges for armed robbery. He had taken out a $300,000 life insurance policy payable to his wife and had bought sticks of dynamite at a hardware store before carrying out the murder-suicide.
American composer Richard Rodgers became the first "EGOT" (the winner of a Emmy, Grammy, Oscar, and Tony for television, recorded music, film and stage, respectively) when he received the Emmy Award for Outstanding Original Music for Television, as composer of music for the ABC television show Winston Churchill: The Valiant Years. He had won an Oscar in 1945 for Best Original Song ("It Might as Well Be Spring"), his first Tony Award in 1950 (South Pacific, and his first Grammy Award in 1961 for The Sound of Music.
Born:
Brian Pillman, American football player and professional Wrestler who worked for WCW and the WWF (now WWE) (died from heart disease 1997)
John Sarbanes, American politician and U.S. Representative for Maryland’s 3rd district since 2007, son of longtime Congressman and Senator Paul Sarbanes; in Baltimore

May 23, 1962 (Wednesday)
Former French Army General Raoul Salan, founder of the French terrorist Organisation armée secrète, was sentenced to life imprisonment for treason, after initially being given a death sentence in absentia. General Salan would be pardoned by President Charles de Gaulle on June 15, 1968, after more than six years' incarceration at the prison in Tulle.
Ernst Krenek's opera What Price Confidence? premièred at Saarbrücken, seventeen years after its composition.
The first successful reattachment (replantation) of a severed limb was accomplished by Dr. Ronald A. Malt at Massachusetts General Hospital in Boston. Everett Knowles, a 12-year-old boy, had had his right arm severed at the shoulder by a freight train. A year after the limb was saved, Everett could move all five fingers and bend his wrist, and by 1965, he was again playing baseball and tennis.
U.S. President Kennedy signed a Presidential Directive waiving the quota against accepting immigrants from China. Since 1943, the quota for Chinese immigrants had been only 105 per year. Within three years, President Lyndon Johnson would put the quota for Asian nations at the same level as that for European nations.
Representatives of McDonnell and Manned Spacecraft Center completed a series of 24 meetings to negotiate the technical details of McDonnell's plans for supporting and documenting Project Gemini, specifications for Gemini systems and subsystems, environmental and structural design criteria for the spacecraft, spacecraft performance specifications, test programs, and plans for reliability, quality assurance, and validation. Meetings had begun April 19.
Ames Research Center began the first wind tunnel test of the half-scale inflatable paraglider wing in support of the Paraglider Development Program. This was the first test of a large-scale inflatable paraglider wing in the full-scale test facility. The purpose of the test was to obtain basic aerodynamic and loads data for the combined wing/spacecraft system and to spot and evaluate potential aerodynamic and design problem areas. The flight regimes studied included wing deployment as well as glide, preflare, and flare. In the last stages of the test, the sail ripped. Since the basic objectives had already been achieved, and the failure occurred under conditions more stringent than any expected during flight testing, only minor corrective action was considered necessary and the test was not repeated. Testing ended July 25; at a paraglider landing system coordination meeting on July 26, the Ames test program was considered completed.
Representatives from Avco Manufacturing Corporation made a presentation to MSC on a proposal for a space station. The prime purpose of the station, company spokesmen said, was to determine the effects of zero-g on the crew's ability to stand reentry and thus fix the limit that humans could safely remain in orbit. A standard Gemini spacecraft was to serve as ferry vehicle.

On May 23 and 24, Manned Spacecraft Center concurred in McDonnell's proposed sequencing of the paraglider recovery system. The paraglider wing itself would be jettisoned shortly after touchdown. At this point, plans called for the paraglider to be used on all Gemini missions except the first.
Died: Rubén Jaramillo, 61, Mexican activist for land reform, along with his wife and three of his four children, after being arrested by Mexican soldiers at his home in Xochicalco.

May 24, 1962 (Thursday)
The U.S. Embassy in Moscow renewed the passport of Lee Harvey Oswald and approved the entry of his wife and daughter into the United States.

Mercury-Atlas 7 (MA-7), the fourth crewed mission of Project Mercury, was launched into Earth orbit with astronaut Scott Carpenter as the pilot. The three-orbit flight of the space capsule, designated Aurora 7, achieved all objectives. Only one critical component malfunction occurred during the mission - a random failure of the circuitry associated with the pitch horizon scanner, which provided a reference point to the attitude gyros. Also during the flight there was concern over the excessive fuel usage, a condition which resulted from extensive use of the high-thrust controls and the inadvertant use of two control systems simultaneously. To compensate, the spacecraft was allowed to drift for 77 minutes, in addition to the drifting already a part of the flight plan. The overshoot was traced to a 25-degree yaw error at the time the retrograde rockets were fired. Computers at the Goddard Space Flight Center predicted the overshoot after the retrofire action. Carpenter, who had deployed a rubber raft, was recovered by a helicopter and taken to the  after being in the water for 2 hours and 59 minutes. The astronaut did not incur any detrimental physical or biomedical effects. Carpenter's rocket lifted off from Cape Canaveral at 7:45 am local time, went around the Earth three times, then began its return at 1:30. Instead of being tilted 34° toward the horizon, the capsule was inclined at 25° and overshot its mark, landing at 1:41 pm. Two experiments were aboard the MA-7 spacecraft: one pertained to the behavior of liquid in a weightless state, and the other was a deployed balloon to measure drag and provide visibility data. The balloon failed to inflate properly, but the liquid reacted as had been anticipated. Carpenter also saw John Glenn's "fire-flies."
North American began a test program to qualify the emergency parachute system for the half-scale Gemini flight test vehicle required for Phase II-A of the Paraglider Development Program. The first two drop tests were successful (May 24, June 20); but during the third (July 10), the main recovery parachute failed to deploy. The trouble was analyzed and detailed modifications were worked out at a meeting on August 16 between North American and Northrop Ventura. The modifications proved successful in the fourth test (September 4), and Manned Spacecraft Center concurred with North American in judging the emergency parachute system for the half-scale test program to be qualified.
The string quartet piece ST/10=1, 080262, the first classical music composed using a computer, was premiered. Greek composer Iannis Xenakis had created the work with the aid of an IBM 7090 computer.

May 25, 1962 (Friday)
The new Coventry Cathedral, also known as St Michael's Cathedral, was consecrated in Coventry, West Midlands, for the Church of England, more than 20 years after the November 14, 1940 destruction of the 500-year-old Cathedral by German Luftwaffe bombers during World War II.  The new cathedral, symbolic of forgiveness and rebirth, stands next to the ruins of the old one.
A group of students at Haigazian University in Beirut launched the first rocket in what would become the Lebanese space program, sending the HCRS-7 Cedar rocket to an altitude of  under the supervision and protection of the Lebanese Army, which arranged for the clearing of airspace around the launch area.
Born: Anthony Joyner, American serial killer and rapist convicted for at least six homicides (and suspected in 12 others) of elderly women at a nursing home where he was employed; in Philadelphia
Died: 
Simone Tanner Chaumet, 45, French humanitarian honored for her role in saving hundreds of Jewish children in France during World War II, and later a peace activist in Algeria, was murdered in the Algiers suburb of Bouzaréah.
David Ogle, 40, English automobile designer who had founded his own sports car company, was killed while driving his Ogle Mini GT sports to a race circuit where he was going to demonstrate the vehicle.  He was on the A1 highway at Digswell, Hertfordshire and traveling at  when he collided with a van and the car burst into flame.

May 26, 1962 (Saturday)
Acker Bilk's "Stranger On The Shore" became the first British recording to reach number one in the U.S. Billboard Hot 100, setting a background for the "British Invasion" that would follow with The Tornados later in the year, and with The Beatles, Peter and Gordon, The Animals and Manfred Mann with nine #1 hits between them in 1964.
Born: Bobcat Goldthwait (stage name for Robert Francis Goldwait), American comedian on film and TV; in Syracuse, New York

May 27, 1962 (Sunday)
Scott Carpenter and Walter C. Williams were awarded the NASA Distinguished Service Medal by James E. Webb, NASA Administrator, in a ceremony at Cape Canaveral.
Pursuant to the township council resolution of May 7, the contents of the new landfill in Centralia, Pennsylvania, a town with 1,435 residents, were burned as part of a cleanup on the day before Memorial Day. As had been done in the past, the volunteer fire department then extinguished the blaze. The new landfill, however, had been placed above an abandoned coal mine and the fire continued to burn underground, ultimately reducing Centralia to a ghost town.
Born: Ravi Shastri, Indian cricketer who was captain of the Indian national team in the 1980s and later the team's coach; in Bombay (now Mumbai)
Died: Egon Petri, 81, Dutch pianist

May 28, 1962 (Monday)
The Soviet Union launched the Kosmos 5 scientific research and technology demonstration satellite, becoming the last satellite in the Kosmos programme to reach orbit successfully.
Flight and ground tests disclosed that retrorocket heater blankets were unnecessary to the Mercury spacecraft, and this item was removed.
For possible application purposes, and upon request, the Manned Spacecraft Center shipped Mercury-type survival kits to the U.S. Air Force for its X-20 Dyna Soar development program and to the U.S. Navy.
Born:
Monie Captan, Foreign Minister of Liberia from 1996 to 2003
Brandon Cruz, American TV actor and punk rock musician who co-starred as a child with Bill Bixby in The Courtship of Eddie's Father, and was lead vocalist as an adult for Dead Kennedys; in Bakersfield, California
Mary Portas, English retail adviser, journalist and television presenter; in Rickmansworth, Hertfordshire
Died: Assar Gabrielsson, 70, Swedish industrialist and co-founder of the Volvo automobile company

May 29, 1962 (Tuesday)
Stock prices fell worldwide in the largest one-day decline since the Great Depression. Heavy sales were registered in New York, London, Tokyo, Paris, Frankfurt and Zurich.
Negotiations began between the European French Algerian paramilitary rebels of the OAS (Organisation armée secrète), and the Arab Algerian independence fighters of the (FLN) Front de libération nationale with a goal toward reaching a ceasefire between the two armies in the Algerian War. Fighting would finally cease on June 17, 1962, and Algeria would become an independent nation, ruled by its Arab Algerian majority population, on July 5.
In a runoff in the primary election for the Democratic Party nominee for Governor of Alabama, segregationist and circuit judge George C. Wallace defeated state senator Ryan DeGraffenried, Sr.
Four window cleaners were killed when a scaffold fell from the 19th floor of the Equitable Building in Manhattan.
Representatives of McDonnell, Weber Aircraft, Gemini Procurement Office, Life Systems Division, Gemini Project Office, and US Naval Ordnance Test Station, China Lake, California, concluded plans for development testing of the spacecraft ejection seat. Requirements peculiar to the Gemini spacecraft, in particular off-the-pad abort capability, caused the plan to stress testing from a stationary tower early in the test program. The purpose of these simulated off-the-pad ejection tests was to investigate the effects of varying the center of gravity on the trajectory of the ejected seat and to optimize the timing of the recovery sequence. Tower tests began July 2. They were to be followed by rocket sled ejection tests to investigate simultaneous ejection with open hatches at maximum dynamic pressure. Sled tests actually began on November 9, before tower tests had been completed.

May 30, 1962 (Wednesday)
Seventy people were killed in the deadliest road accident up to that time, when an overloaded Gujarat State Road Transport Corporation bus in India crashed through a bridge railing near Kapadvanj and sank in the Mahi River.  Only 18 people survived.
On the same day, in the Philippines, 30 people were killed and 10 injured when a bus, carrying students on a holiday outing, fell off of a wooden bridge and was swept away by the Alalum Falls near the town of Sumilao in the Bukidnon province on southern Mindanao.
The 1962 FIFA World Cup began in Chile with 16 nations qualifying for the competition to reach the final, with four groups of four teams each.  On the first day, with games all starting at 3:00 in the afternoon, Uruguay beat Colombia 2—1 (Group 1) at Arica; Chile beat Switzerland 3—1 (Group 2) at Santiago; Brazil beat Mexico 2—0 (Group 3) at Viña del Mar; and Argentina beat Bulgaria 1—0 (Group 4) at Rancagua/ 
Benjamin Britten's War Requiem was performed for the first time, in the arts festival held to celebrate the reconsecration of Coventry Cathedral.
Born: Timo Soini, Deputy Prime Minister of Finland and Foreign Minister since 2015; in Rauma
Died: Pierre Gilliard, 85, Swiss academic, former tutor to the Russian royal family

May 31, 1962 (Thursday)
A speeding freight train crashed through the back of a passenger train near Voghera, Italy, killing 62 people. Most of the dead were vacationers on their way to the French Riviera.
The hanging of Adolf Eichmann, 56, German Nazi and SS-Obersturmbannführer (Lieutenant Colonel) and one of the major organizers of the Holocaust, took place at 11:58 pm local time "on an improvised scaffold in a third story storeroom" at the Ayalon Prison in Ramla, near Tel Aviv. Eichmann, who had been captured by agents of Israel's Mossad spy agency on March 21, 1960, and then taken from Argentina to Israel for his role in the extermination of 6,000,000 European Jews, would become the first person to be legally executed in the history of modern Israel. The body was cremated soon afterward and Eichmann's ashes scattered over the Mediterranean Sea.
The Northern Ireland general election produced a large majority for the Ulster Unionist Party, which won 34 out of 51 seats. The Nationalist Party gained 2 seats to give it a total of nine.
Technical Report No. 138, entitled "Results of Project Mercury Ballistic and Orbital Chimpanzee Flights," was completed.
Born: Sebastian Koch, German film actor (The Lives of Others, Bridge of Spies), in Karlsruhe, West Germany

References

1962
1962-05
1962-05
Articles containing video clips